Bogdan Junior Măcriș (born 28 January 1997) is a Romanian professional footballer who plays as striker.

Career statistics
Statistics accurate as of match played 17 October 2015

References

External links
 at Soccerway

Living people
1997 births
Footballers from Bucharest
Association football midfielders
Romanian footballers
CSA Steaua București footballers
FC Steaua București players
Liga I players
Liga II players
Romania youth international footballers